Matlock is the surname of:

 Bob Matlock (1918–2006), Australian rules footballer
 Glen Matlock (born 1956), English bass player in the original line-up for punk band the Sex Pistols
 Jack F. Matlock Jr. (born 1929), American diplomat
 Jimmy Matlock (born 1959), American politician
 Leroy Matlock (1907–1968), American Negro league baseball player
 Mark Matlock (born 1969), founder and president of WisdomWorks Ministries
 Matty Matlock (1907–1978), American jazz musician and arranger
 Michelle Matlock, American professional clown and female lead in the Cirque du Soleil production Ovo
 Rebecca Matlock (1928–2019), photographer and wife of former U.S. Ambassador Jack F. Matlock, Jr
 Ronn Matlock (1947–2020), American singer and songwriter
 Spider Matlock (1901–1936), American stuntman and racing mechanic
 Victoria Matlock (born 1978), American musical theatre actress